Kasama is a city in the Northern Province of Zambia. It serves as the provincial capital and the headquarters of Kasama District.

Location

Kasama is located on the M1 road (old Great North Road) from Mpika in the south to Mbala and Mpulungu, at the tip of Lake Tanganyika, in the north.

Population
The city population grew considerably in the 1970s and 1980s after construction of the TAZARA Railway through the city, and the tarring of the Great North Road, Zambia. Its population, according to Encyclopedia Britannica, was 74,243 in 2000 and had increased to 113,779 in 2010.

History 

In 1898/1899, a crisis over the succession of the Chitimukulu led to Bishop Joseph 'Moto Moto' Dupont gaining the agreement of Bemba chiefs to the British colonial Administrator of North-Eastern Rhodesia, Robert Codrington taking control of the area. Codrington established a boma at Kasama and the town's central location as well as its closeness to Chitimukulu's court led to it eventually becoming the largest and dominant town of the north-eastern lobe of what became Northern Rhodesia, then later, Zambia.

Economic activities 
The town has a few modern facilities, among them are a Shoprite Checkers branch, Budget Stores, a local supermarket called PJT and four bakeries. The town has branches of Zambian commercial banks including Zambia National Commercial Bank, National Savings & Credit Bank, Atlas Mara Bank Zambia Limited, Standard Chartered Zambia, Cavmont Bank, Barclays Bank of Zambia, Access Bank Zambia and Indo-Zambia Bank Limited. The town has VISA and ATM services.

Most people in Kasama are not formally employed and they run small businesses to earn a living. The hospital is the Kasama General Hospital, that provides locals with health services. The city has a police station and several police posts. The available mobile telephone operators include MTN Group, Airtel Zambia and Zamtel.

There are several Agri Based industries in Kasama, which include Northern Coffee Company Limited (NCCL), a subsidiary of Olam International, growing coffee at Kateshi Estates, and Kalungwishi Estates growing sugar cane and producing the Kasama Sugar brand.

Ethnic Groups 

Suburbs 
Kasama has the following residential compounds within the district council boundaries:
 Central Town (the largest)
 New Town or Mbulo
 Location
 Mukulumpe
 Chikumanino

The compounds below are out of the council boundary:
 Mulenga Hills
 Jazz
 Tazara
 Misamfu
 Milima
 Chiba
 Chitamba
 Brown
 Winberg
 Kasama Village
 Kungu
 Mutale/Milenge
 Chisanga
 Soft Katongo
 Lua Luo

Transport
Kasama is served by a good network of major highways. It is on the M1 road, which goes south to Mpika and north to Mbala. The M3 road connects Kasama with Luwingu, Mansa and the Congo Pedicle in the west. The D18 road connects Kasama with Mungwi and Isoka in the east.

The  gauge TAZARA Railway connects Tanzania to the north-east via Kasama, with Zambia Railways at Kapiri Mposhi to the south-west.

Air transport is accessible through Kasama Airport. It can accommodate small aircraft, and it is undergoing an upgrade to be able to accommodate larger aircraft. It was expected to be ready by the end of 2017.

Recreation 

Kasama recreational facilities include the Kasama golf club, which also offers tennis, volleyball, badminton, body building, and a small football ground with one stand that can seat less than a thousand people. The town has other football grounds where people can play soccer.

There are resorts at Chishimba Falls and guest houses and lodges such as the Chinchi's Nest and Kings Guest House, and 3 nightclubs.

Rivers 
Kasama District has five big rivers and these include, Chambeshi, Lukulu, Lukupa, Lubansenshi and Luombe. The Chishimba Falls are found across the Luombe River and are one of the major tourist attraction in Zambia. The falls host the 15 megawatts Chishimba Hydroelectric Power Station.

Climate

World War I 

At the end of World War I, when it consisted of a handful of government offices and a dozen stores, it was evacuated by its British population of a couple of dozen in the face of a surprise raid from the north-east by German East African forces under General Paul von Lettow-Vorbeck. Not knowing that the armistice had occurred in Europe the day before, the Germans took the abandoned town on 12 November 1918 and continued south-west (there was no battle at Kasama since the British imperial forces were at Abercorn), agreeing a cease-fire at the Chambeshi River on 14 November when they were informed of the German surrender in Europe. For further details, see Von Lettow-Vorbeck Memorial.

Art 
Kasama is known for the Stone Age rock art in the surrounding area. The Chishimba Falls also lie near the town.

Notable People
Alexander Chikwanda - Minister of Finance, 2011-2016, born in Kasama.

See also 
 Railway stations in Zambia
 St. John the Apostle Cathedral, Kasama

References 

 
Populated places in Northern Province, Zambia
Provincial capitals in Zambia